Lower Hermitage is a locality in the Adelaide Hills region, located approximately  northeast of Adelaide in  South Australia. It is aligned north–south along Lower Hermitage Road.

The heritage-listed Glen Ewin complex including a house and former jam factory buildings (pulping shed, jam factory, sugar store, packing shed and jam kitchen) is situated in the area surrounding the locality.

References

Towns in South Australia